Essential Yello is a compilation album by Swiss electronic duo Yello. It was first released in 1992  and also available as a sell-through video release (on VHS and later on DVD).

Track listing
 "Oh Yeah"  – 3:05
 "The Race"  – 3:15
 "Drive/Driven"  – 4:11
 "Rubberbandman"  – 3:35
 "Vicious Games"  – 4:19
 "Tied Up"  – 3:32
 "Lost Again"  – 4:19
 "I Love You"  – 4:05
 "Of Course I'm Lying"  – 3:50
 "Pinball Cha Cha"  – 3:33
 "Bostich"  – 4:35
 "Desire"  – 3:40
 "Jungle Bill"  – 3:35
 "Call It Love"  – 4:05
 "Goldrush"  – 4:20
 "The Rhythm Divine" (featuring Shirley Bassey)  – 4:20

 An edition with "Tremendous Pain" and "Jingle Bells" as bonus tracks also exists.
 In its video releases (both VHS and DVD) the song "Drive/Driven" is replaced by the video "Who's Gone?" (from their 1991 Baby album).

Charts

Certifications

References

Yello albums
1993 compilation albums
Mercury Records compilation albums
Vertigo Records compilation albums
Smash Records compilation albums